Heterachthes is a genus of beetles in the family Cerambycidae, containing the following species:

 Heterachthes aeneolus Bates, 1885
 Heterachthes annulicornis Martins, 2009
 Heterachthes apicalis (Blair, 1933)
 Heterachthes beatrizae Noguera, 2005
 Heterachthes bilineatus (Bates, 1885)
 Heterachthes candidus (Bates, 1885)
 Heterachthes castaneus Martins, 1970
 Heterachthes concretus Martins, 1970
 Heterachthes congener Martins, 1965
 Heterachthes delicatus Martins, 2009
 Heterachthes designatus Martins, 1970
 Heterachthes dimidiatus (Thomson, 1865)
 Heterachthes ebenus Newman, 1840
 Heterachthes erineus Martins, 1970
 Heterachthes exiguus Martins, 2009
 Heterachthes fascinatus Martins, 1971
 Heterachthes figuratus Martins, 1970
 Heterachthes flavicornis (Thomson, 1865)
 Heterachthes fraterculus Martins & Napp, 1986
 Heterachthes gratiosus Martins, 1970
 Heterachthes gutta Martins, 2009
 Heterachthes howdeni Martins, 1970
 Heterachthes hystricosus Martins, 1971
 Heterachthes integripennis (Bates, 1885)
 Heterachthes inustus Gounelle, 1909
 Heterachthes laesicollis (Germar, 1824)
 Heterachthes lateralis Martins, 1962
 Heterachthes lemniscus Martins, 1970
 Heterachthes leucoacnus Martins, 1970
 Heterachthes longiscapus Martins, 1970
 Heterachthes martinsi Hovore, 1988
 Heterachthes mediovittatus Martins, 1962
 Heterachthes mucuni Martins & Galileo, 1999
 Heterachthes myrrheus Gounelle, 1910
 Heterachthes neocompsoides Giesbert, 1998
 Heterachthes nigrocinctus Bates, 1872
 Heterachthes nobilis LeConte, 1862
 Heterachthes pallidipennis (Thomson, 1865)
 Heterachthes paraiba Martins, 2009
 Heterachthes pelonioides (Thomson, 1867)
 Heterachthes picturatus Martins, 1970
 Heterachthes plagiatus (Burmeister, 1865)
 Heterachthes polingi (Fall, 1925)
 Heterachthes quadrimaculatus Haldeman, 1847
 Heterachthes rafaeli Galileo & Martins, 2011
 Heterachthes rubricolor Melzer, 1935
 Heterachthes rugosicollis Martins, 1970
 Heterachthes sablensis Blatchley, 1920
 Heterachthes sejunctus Gounelle, 1909
 Heterachthes sexguttatus (Audinet-Serville, 1834)
 Heterachthes signaticollis (Thomson, 1865)
 Heterachthes similis Martins, 1965
 Heterachthes spilotus Martins, 1971
 Heterachthes symbolus Martins, 1970
 Heterachthes taquatinga Martins, 2009
 Heterachthes tenellus (Burmeister, 1865)
 Heterachthes texanus Linsley, 1957
 Heterachthes tysiphonis (Thomson, 1867)
 Heterachthes unituberosus Martins & Galileo, 1999
 Heterachthes v-flavum Martins, 2009
 Heterachthes vauriae Martins, 1971
 Heterachthes viticulus Martins, 1970
 Heterachthes w-notatum Linsley, 1935
 Heterachthes wappesi Martins & Napp, 1986
 Heterachthes x-notatum (Linsley, 1935)
 Heterachthes xenocerus Martins, 1960
 Heterachthes xyleus Martins, 1974

References

 
Ibidionini